Eugene B. Hyde (January 13, 1849 – May 26, 1917) was an American politician in the state of Washington. He served in the Washington State Senate from 1891 to 1895.

References

Republican Party Washington (state) state senators
1849 births
1917 deaths
19th-century American politicians
People from Utica, Winnebago County, Wisconsin